Emma-Sofie Mohrsen Nordström (born 5 November 2002) is a Swedish-Danish ice hockey goaltender and member of the Danish national ice hockey team, currently playing with Linköping HC Dam of the Swedish Women's Hockey League (SDHL). She is a commit to the St. Lawrence Saints women's ice hockey program of St. Lawrence University in Canton, New York.

Nordström represented Denmark at the IIHF Women's World Championship Division I Group A tournament in 2018 and at the Top Division tournament in 2021. As a junior player with the Danish national under-18 team, she participated in the IIHF Women's U18 World Championship Division I Group B tournaments in 2017 and 2018, and in the Division I Group A tournaments in 2019 and 2020.

Personal life

Nordström is a dual citizen of Denmark and Sweden – her father, Peter Nordström, is Swedish and her mother, Birgitte Mohrsen Nordström, is Danish.

Her mother's side of the family, the Andersens, have earned the moniker "Denmark’s hockey factory" due to the number of elite players it has produced. No exception is Nordström's mother, who was a goaltender with the Danish national ice hockey team during the late 1990s and 2000s and participated in five IIHF World Championships across the Pool B, Division I, and Division II levels. Her uncles Ernst Andersen and Kim Mohrs Andersen both represented  at several Ice Hockey World Championship Pool B tournaments in the 1990s. In Nordström's generation, her elder cousin Frederik Andersen, an active NHLer, and younger cousin Valdemar Andersen are also goaltenders. Bucking the goaltending trend are her younger brother Lukas and elder cousins Amalie Andersen and Sebastian Andersen, all of whom are defensemen, and cousin Karl Andersen, a left winger, who slots in as the only forward of the bunch.

Ice hockey genes aren't limited to the Andersen side of her family, as her father played as a goaltender in Swedish and Danish high-level leagues during the 1990s and 2000s. Melker Thelin, her younger cousin, is active as a goaltender in Swedish junior leagues.

Career statistics

International 

Sources:

References

External links 
 

Living people
2002 births
People from Herning Municipality
Danish women's ice hockey goaltenders
Swedish women's ice hockey goaltenders
Linköping HC Dam players
Modo Hockey Dam players
Danish people of Swedish descent
Swedish people of Danish descent
Ice hockey players at the 2022 Winter Olympics
Olympic ice hockey players of Denmark
Sportspeople from the Central Denmark Region